Chromis agilis, the agile chromis, is a species of damselfish belonging to the genus Chromis. It can be found in the Indian Ocean, from the Maldives, the Chagos Archipelago, Seychelles, Madagascar, the Comoro Islands, and along the East African coastline between Shimoni in Kenya and Bazaruto in Mozambique. It inhabits clear lagoons and seaward reefs, usually in loose aggregations near caves and ledges. It is commonly found over branching corals and leeward coasts. It is oviparous, and the males of the species guard and aerate the eggs.

References

agilis
Fish of the Indian Ocean
Taxa named by J. L. B. Smith
Fish described in 1960